Realivox is a voice synthesizer.

About
The software allows editing and adjustment of sounds. The software comes in two forms, although both aim at achieving similar goals. It is also able to work with Kontakt.

Products
Realivox Ladies: This is a multi-pack version with 5 female vocals each with a different vocal style- Cheryl (airy vocal designed for film cues), Teresa (soprano opera singer), Patty (pop singer and ethnic music), Julie (full range) and Toni (RnB).  Unlike Blue, Ladies is focused on simple 32 key sound samples such as "ah". Due to every instance using a voice selection option, it is possible to build up the vocals to create a choir of sounds using the five vocals.  The package comes as a "lite" or "full" version, with the difference being that Teresa is absent in the lite version.  The package has also been updated to version 2 since original release. The updated version contains double the amount of articulations as the original. The update was done with fresh recordings from the original singers.
Realivox - Blue: This is a classical style singer pack with a solo female vocalist. In contrast to the "Realivox Ladies" product, Blue is a more complex package with advanced features. Her vocal is complex with 12,000 samples with 32 samples per sound covering two and a half octaves of singing vocal result, while closing consonants have 192 samples for certain sounds such as "t".  All six vowels contain legato results, this is also included for humming sounds sound as "mm". She also contains polyphonic legato capabilities. She is designed to be a go-between vocal and has realistic tones. The samples are combined to build words, with the transition between the sounds being almost invisible. She was released on May 26, 2014.

Reception
Richard Leiter, at Keyboard magazine, commented that both products give an uncanny realistic result that had an "effortless" learning curve. He, however, commented that singers like Adele need not worry about the package's results. He felt the product was best suited for solo lines and backup singers, offering a product at the price that would cost more to do the same effort with real singers for a single vocal recording session.

References

Speech synthesis software
Singing software synthesizers